The Jack Ryan franchise consists of American action-thriller installments, based on the fictional titular character from a series of novels written by Tom Clancy. Various actors have portrayed the role.

Despite inconsistency with its lead actors and crew members, the series has been distributed solely by Paramount Pictures since its inception. Mace Neufeld has produced every film in the series, with producing partner Robert Rehme co-producing Patriot Games and Clear and Present Danger, and Lorenzo di Bonaventura co-producing Shadow Recruit. With a combined unadjusted worldwide gross of $788.4 million to date, the films constitute the 57th highest-grossing film series. The films have been nominated for four Academy Awards, winning one for Sound Effects (now Sound Editing) in The Hunt for Red October (at the 63rd Awards).

The continuity of the films does not follow the established timeline of the novels. In the book series, Patriot Games occurs before The Hunt for Red October, though the order was reversed in the film adaptations. Additionally, The Sum of All Fears departs significantly from its source material, with the events of the plot shifted from 1991 to 2002. Jack Ryan: Shadow Recruit (2014) was a reboot, and intended first film in a new film series. Due to mixed reception, a sequel was never made. Despite this, the franchise continues with the television series titled Tom Clancy's Jack Ryan, on Prime Video.

Development
After viewing galley proofs of Tom Clancy's 1984 novel The Hunt for Red October, producer Mace Neufeld optioned the rights to the novel in 1985. Despite the book becoming a best seller, no Hollywood studio was interested in purchasing the film rights because of the high cost of trying to condense the book's massive content into a two-hour film. "This book doesn't condense well into two or three pages", said Neufeld. "I read some of the reports from the other studios and the story was too complicated to understand. Fortunately, I was able to get a major executive at Paramount to read the book and he said: 'I think this can make a great movie. Let's see if we can develop it'".

Films

The Hunt for Red October (1990)

During 1984, Central Intelligence Agency analyst Jack Ryan (Alec Baldwin) must track down the Red October, a technologically superior Soviet nuclear submarine heading to America's east coast under the command of Captain Marko Ramius (Sean Connery), and prove to the American government his theory that the sub's mission is to defect rather than attack the American coast. Upon successfully boarding the vessel, Ryan is to signal the American submarine USS Dallas to assist the Red October in escaping from attacks by the Soviet submarine V.K. Konovalov so that it may be brought safely into US waters.

Patriot Games (1992)

Former CIA analyst-turned field operative Jack Ryan (Harrison Ford), is now a professor at the U.S. Naval Academy after previously receiving serious injury while intervening in an attack on the British Secretary of State for Northern Ireland in London and successfully killing one of the assailants. Because the remaining attackers were able to escape, the group now seeks revenge including Sean Miller (Sean Bean), the brother of the man Ryan killed. Miller vows to hunt down Ryan and avenge his brother, no matter how long it takes. Eventually, Ryan and his family are attacked in two separate, but simultaneous attempts. Ryan decides to rejoin the CIA, so that he can stop this group of Irish revolutionaries and protect the ones he loves.

Clear and Present Danger (1994)

Jack Ryan (Harrison Ford) is appointed as acting-CIA Deputy Director of Intelligence, as Vice Admiral James Greer (James Earl Jones) has been battling cancer. When a family close to the President is murdered in their sleep, by what appears to be a drug cartel, Ryan is called as investigator. Unknown to him, the CIA sends in a secret field operative to lead an illegal paramilitary force against the cartels in Colombia with the help of John Clark (Willem Dafoe). Risking both his life and his career, Ryan races against time to expose the truth.

The Sum of All Fears (2002)

A contemporary prequel, set during 2002, the plot portrays a younger Jack Ryan. After the President of the Russian Federation dies and is replaced by a man with a mysterious past, the United States goes on a Cold War-like state of alert. CIA director William Cabot (Morgan Freeman) recruits young analyst Jack Ryan (Ben Affleck) and assigns him to the situation in Russia, with the task to determine whether the paranoia is legitimate. Ryan soon discovers that a neo-nazi terrorist group plans to provoke a war between the U.S. and Russia, by detonating a nuclear bomb at a football game in Baltimore. Ryan works to resolve the assignment before it's too late.

Jack Ryan: Shadow Recruit (2014)

A reboot of the film series, set during 2013. After the events of the September 11 attacks, Jack Ryan (Chris Pine), studying at the London School of Economics, becomes a Marine second lieutenant in Afghanistan. While on military tour he is critically injured after his helicopter is shot down. Twelve years later, Ryan is working undercover as a CIA analyst, and posing in a cover job on Wall Street as a compliance officer at a stock brokerage. He quickly discovers that certain accounts are inaccessible to him as the auditor, which leads him to discover the scheme of Viktor Cherevin (Kenneth Branagh). With the help of Thomas Harper (Kevin Costner), Jack works to stop Cherevin's plot to collapse the US dollar.

Television

Tom Clancy's Jack Ryan (2018–present)

Cast and crew

Cast

Crew

Reception

Box office performance

Critical and public response

Home media
On February 7, 2003, Paramount announced a box set entitled The Jack Ryan Special Edition DVD Collection, which includes new editions of The Hunt for Red October, Patriot Games and Clear and Present Danger as well as the special edition of The Sum of All Fears. Both the set and the individual editions of each film were released on May 6, 2003. While the four films were originally intended to be released in a Blu-ray collection entitled The Jack Ryan Collection, the films were later broken up into separate releases for the high definition format on July 29, 2008. On December 3, 2013, The Jack Ryan Collection was finally issued on Blu-ray.

Other media

Video games
The film series has spawned three video games for various systems. Two side scroller games were produced in 1990 to coincide with the release of The Hunt for Red October, one for computer systems was released by Grandslam Interactive Ltd. while another was released for Nintendo consoles by Hi-Tech Expressions, Inc. In 2002, the video game The Sum of All Fears was released by Ubisoft for the PC, PlayStation 2 and Nintendo GameCube.

Domingo Chavez (as Ding Chavez) and John Clark both appear as a member and the leader of Team Rainbow in the older Rainbow Six games, these characters also appeared in the book.

Cancelled projects

A film, based on the novel The Cardinal of the Kremlin, was planned. It was to involve Harrison Ford and William Shatner. It was never released and the idea was most likely scrapped.

References

External links
 Jack Ryan (Character) at the Internet Movie Database

Action film series
Spy film series
American spy films
Techno-thriller films
Film series introduced in 1990
Paramount Pictures franchises